Kerry on Kutton is a Bollywood feature film starring Satyajeet Dubey, Aradhana Jagota, Aditya Kumar, Shivam Pradhan and Karan Mahavar. Produced by Shashank Shekhar Singh, Trishank Entertainment Pvt. Ltd. It released all over India on 1 July 2016. The movie is directed by Ashok Yadav.

Plot summary
Four teenage lives undergoing a distorted upbringing intertwine in India's small town Ballia, also known as the city of rebels, eventually leading themselves into the dark zone of crime. Kerry whose only ambition in life is to lose his virginity. Kadambari who does not want to take over his family legacy of a Band Party and wants to become a millionaire by mating dogs just like Rajesh Chacha, all he has to do is steal a high breed puppy from Bade Babu and reach Rajesh Chacha. Suraj who wants to gift a touch phone to his love Jyoti but can't because of his miser father and Jyoti who uses her beauty as a tool to blackmail her lovers to achieve her materialistic demands.

Cast
Satyajeet Dubey as Kerry
Aditya Kumar as Kadambari
Aradhana Jagota as Jyoti
Deepraj Rana as Kerry's Father Laal Dhari 
Reecha Sharma as Jyoti's Mausi
Tushar Bajpai as Transgender

Reception

The movie has received positive reviews from critics. Indian critic Suparna Sharma has praised the movie and mentioned in her review published in Deccan Chronicle and Asian Age, "The film opens with one of the best making-out scenes I've seen in Hindi cinema. It's hurried, awkward and disastrous. It is the kind of film where the writers, director and actors have plugged into not just the characters, but also the circumstance they were born into, the place and, hence, their stories. This shines throughout Kerry on Kutton and it's no mean feat. Kerry on Kutton carries in its sounds, sights and similes a strong stench of Baghi Ballia, a dusty patch of UP badland that's not just nostalgic about the reputation it once had, but can also be delusional."

Another critic Sankhayan Ghosh writes in Hindu, "In the bizarrely named Kerry on Kutto, a clandestine meeting between Jyoti (Aradhana Jagota) and Kerry (Satyajeet Dubey) takes place in an aloo ka gudaam – a potato godown. Before we know it, they are making out. While they are at it, they make fart jokes and Jyoti remarks on Kerry's pan-stained teeth, "Itna masala kyun khaate ho?" before engaging in a long smooch.This scene from the film stands out as it bends the rules of the standard lovemaking scene in Hindi cinema. It is more carnal desire than genteel lovemaking. And the embracing of the inappropriateness, albeit done in a comical way, is a welcome change. In Kerry on Kutton, there are many such moments, dialogues that border on the profane: a heart-to-heart about men's urinal problems or a tooth found in a gulab jamun, most probably the halwai'."

References

External links